Sporting Club de Bastia is a French professional football club based in Stade Armand Cesari, Bastia.

The club has won five major trophies, including the Ligue 2 twice, the Championnat National once, the Coupe de France once, the Trophée des Champions once and the UEFA Intertoto Cup once.

Since the beginning of the club's official managerial records in 1905 but by the 1957–58 season to present, Bastia have had 30 full-time managers.

The current manager of Bastia, is François Ciccolini.

Statistics 
Information correct as of match played 30 August 2015. Only competitive matches are counted.
Table headers
 Nationality – If the manager played international football as a player, the country/countries he played for are shown. Otherwise, the manager's nationality is given as their country of birth.
 From – The year of the manager's first game for Bastia.
 To – The year of the manager's last game for Bastia.
 P – The number of games managed for Bastia.
 W – The number of games won as a manager.
 D – The number of games draw as a manager.
 L – The number of games lost as a manager.
 GF – The number of goals scored under his management.
 GA – The number of goals conceded under his management.
 Win% – The total winning percentage under his management.
 Honours – The trophies won while managing Bastia.
Key
 (n/a) = Information not available

Notes

References

 
Bastia